Mark Koevermans (born 3 February 1968) is a former tennis player from the Netherlands, who turned professional in 1987. He represented his native country as a lucky loser at the 1992 Summer Olympics in Barcelona, where he was defeated in the third round by Brazil's Jaime Oncins. Going by the nickname Koef, a right-hander, won one career title in singles (Athens, 1990). He reached his highest singles ATP-ranking on 27 May 1991, when he was ranked number 37.

In April 2009, Koevermans was appointed as commercial director at Dutch football club Feyenoord.

Career finals

Doubles: 16 (4 wins, 12 losses)

Singles (1 win)

External links
 
 
 

1968 births
Living people
Dutch male tennis players
Olympic tennis players of the Netherlands
Sportspeople from Rotterdam
Tennis players at the 1992 Summer Olympics